Albissola 2010, or simply Albissola, is an Italian association football club, jointly representing the towns of Albissola Marina and Albisola Superiore, Province of Savona, Liguria.

History 
The club, originally named Associazione Sportiva Dilettantistica Albissola 2010, was born in 2010 as the consequence of several mergers involving different football teams based in the bordering cities of Albissola Marina and Albisola Superiore.

Starting as a Prima Categoria club, ASD Albissola won its first promotion in 2011–12. In 2015–16, it started to climb above all the amateur leagues by winning consecutively the Promozione and Eccellenza regional leagues in back-to-back seasons.

In 2017–18, on its very first season of appearance in the Serie D, Albissola won the group title, thus ensuring itself a spot in the professional Serie C league for the 2018–19 season.

Due to the unsuitability of the historic home stadium "Faraggiana" to comply with Serie C regulations, Albissola starts the 2018–19 season by playing temporarily its home games in the Stadio Comunale of Chiavari (the same venue as fellow Serie C club Virtus Entella) until finding a way to adequate the Albissola's stadium or to build a new homeground.

After escaping relegation in its first Serie C campaign, however, Albissola did not submit an application to take part in the following 2019–20 Serie C season due to not having been able to find a suitable home venue; the club is now expected to restart from the amateur leagues. The club will restart from Seconda Categoria.

References

External links
Official website

Football clubs in Liguria
Association football clubs established in 2010
2010 establishments in Italy